Just Dave Van Ronk is a 1964 album by folk/blues singer Dave Van Ronk. It has not been released on CD.

History
It is probably this arrangement of "House Of The Risin' Sun" that was developed by Dave Van Ronk that Bob Dylan — who was a close friend of Van Ronk's at the time — used on his 1962 debut album Bob Dylan. Van Ronk discusses this in Martin Scorsese's documentary No Direction Home. In the interview, Van Ronk said that he was intending to record it at that time, and that Dylan copied his version of the song.

Reception

Writing for Allmusic, music critic Richard Meyer wrote "... Van Ronk's understated guitar style is perfect for these intimate performances. His naturally rough voice allows him to sing these songs believably without any ethnic affectation or false energy."

Track listing 
"Candy Man" (Gary Davis) – 2:29
"Frankie's Blues" (Traditional; arranged by Dave Van Ronk) – 4:36
"Bad  Dream Blues", (Dave Van Ronk) – 4:57
"Pastures of Plenty" (Woody Guthrie) – 3:25
"'Didn't it Rain" (Traditional) – 3:00
"Wanderin'" (Sammy Kaye) – 2:33
"God Bless the Child" (Billie Holiday, Arthur Herzog Jr.) – 4:22
"Blue Monday" (Fats Domino, Dave Bartholomew) – 1:59
"Baby, Let Me Lay It on You" (Reverend Gary Davis) – 1:35
"The House of the Rising Sun" (Arranged by Dave Van Ronk) – 5:35

Personnel
Dave Van Ronk – vocals, acoustic guitar

Production notes
Frank Fried – producer
Rudy Van Gelder – engineer

References

1964 albums
Dave Van Ronk albums
Mercury Records albums
Albums recorded at Van Gelder Studio